Sir Oliver Lyle, OBE (1891–1961) was a British sugar technologist during the early 20th century.

Early life 

Oliver was born in 1891, the year his grandfather, Abram Lyle died, in Weybridge, Surrey to John Lyle, a sugar refiner and ship owner. He grew up in Surrey.

Military 

During World War I he was an officer in the Highland Light Infantry.

Work at Tate and Lyle 

Oliver started work at Abram Lyle's sugar factory at Plaistow when he was 21 and did various manual jobs such as boiling sugar in the refinery pans. Later he and his brother, Philip, became joint refinery directors. Philip died in 1955. Oliver was now the sole male survivor of the third generation of sugar Lyles. Oliver Lyle was a meticulous record-keeper, as can be seen in his pocketbook, which he carried around with him for over 30 years.

Other activities 

Oliver was an investor in Noel Macklin's Invicta Cars.

Family 

Married Lilian Spicer in Chertsey, Surrey in 1914. The couple had five children, John the eldest son went on to work in the family business.

Honours 

In 1919, Lyle was appointed an Officer of the Order of the British Empire. In the 1954 New Year Honours, he was knighted for services in promoting fuel efficiency.

Publications

See also

References

Citations

Sources

External links 
 A visit to the Tate & Lyle archive
 Margaret Macgregor Yorke family tree
 
 
 

Tate & Lyle people
1891 births
1961 deaths
Knights Bachelor
Officers of the Order of the British Empire